This article lists important figures and events in Malayan public affairs during the year 1951, together with births and deaths of significant Malayans.

Incumbent political figures

Central level 
 Governor of Malaya :
 Henry Gurney (until 6 October)
 Vacant (from 6 October)
 Chief Minister of Malaya  :
 Tunku Abdul Rahman Putra

State level 
  Perlis :
 Raja of Perlis : Syed Harun Putra Jamalullail 
 Menteri Besar of Perlis : Raja Ahmad Raja Endut
  Johore :
 Sultan of Johor : Sultan Ibrahim Al-Masyhur
 Menteri Besar of Johore : Vacant 
  Kedah :
 Sultan of Kedah : Sultan Badlishah
 Menteri Besar of Kedah : Mohamad Sheriff Osman
  Kelantan :
 Sultan of Kelantan : Sultan Ibrahim
 Menteri Besar of Kelantan : Nik Ahmad Kamil Nik Mahmud 
  Trengganu :
 Sultan of Trengganu : Sultan Ismail Nasiruddin Shah
 Menteri Besar of Trengganu : Raja Kamaruddin Idris
  Selangor :
 Sultan of Selangor : Sultan Sir Hishamuddin Alam Shah Al-Haj
 Menteri Besar of Selangor : Raja Uda Raja Muhammad
  Penang :
 Monarchs : King George VI 
 Residents-Commissioner : 
 Arthur Vincent Aston (until unknown date)
 Robert Porter Bingham (from unknown date)
  Malacca :
 Monarchs : King George VI 
 Residents-Commissioner :
  Negri Sembilan :
 Yang di-Pertuan Besar of Negri Sembilan : Tuanku Abdul Rahman ibni Almarhum Tuanku Muhammad 
 Menteri Besar Negri Sembilan :
 Muhammad Salleh Sulaiman (until 1 January)
 Abdul Aziz Abdul Majid (from 1 August)  
   Pahang :
 Sultan of Pahang : Sultan Abu Bakar
 Menteri Besar of Pahang : 
 Mahmud Mat (until 1 February)
 Tengku Mohamad Sultan Ahmad (from 1 February)
  Perak :
 British Adviser of Perak : 
 James Innes Miller (until unknown date)
 Ian Blelloch (from unknown date)
 Sultan of Perak : Sultan Yusuf Izzuddin Shah
 Menteri Besar of Perak : Abdul Wahab Toh Muda Abdul Aziz

Events
 18 April – Perak TBG F.C. was officially registered by Perak Amateur Football Association (PAFA).
 21 July – SMJK Seg Hwa was founded by Segamat Chinese community.
6 October – Sir Henry Gurney was assassinated by Communist rebels during his vacation at Fraser's Hill, Pahang.
24 November – The Pan-Malaysian Islamic Party (PAS) was founded by the Pan-Malayan Islamic Organisation.
22 December – The Selangor Labour Party was founded (dissolved in 1952).
 Unknown date –  The Garden International School was founded by Mrs Sally Watkins. This was first school catering to expats and the oldest prestigious school in the Federation of Malaya.
 Unknown date – The Independence of Malaya Party was founded by Dato' Onn Jaafar (dissolved in 1953).
 Unknown date – The Penang Rubber Exchange became officially known as the Rubber Trade Association of Penang, sanctioned by the Registrar of Societies.

Births 
 25 January – Ibrahim Ali – Politician
 3 March  – Botak Chin – Criminal (died 1981)
 5 March – Lat – Famous cartoonist
 10 March – Salamiah Hassan – Singer
 12 March – Ilyas Din – 13th Commander Royal Malaysian Navy 
 30 March – Musa Aman – 14th Chief Minister of Sabah
 25 May – Jamaluddin Jarjis –  Politician and ambassador (died 2015)
 10 June – Bad Latiff – Actor (died 2005)
 24 June – Mohd Sidek Hassan – Former Secretary of State
 16 July – Mohd Fadzillah Kamsah – Motivator expert
 26 August – Abdul Aziz Ismail – 14th Commander Malaysia Armed Forces (2007-2009)
 1 December – Richard Riot Jaem – Politician
 10 December – Rosmah Mansor – Spouse 6th Prime Minister of Malaysia, Najib Razak (2009–present)
 Unknown date – Ali Mamak – Actor and comedian (died 2014)
 Unknown date – Christopher Wan Soo Kee – Director of Bukit Aman Criminal Investigation Department 
 Unknown date – Badruddin Amiruldin – Politician
 Unknown date – Ismail Din – Actor (died 2005)
 Unknown date – Syed Mokhtar Al-Bukhary – Businessman and millionaire

Deaths
 6 October – Sir Henry Gurney – British High Commissioner

See also 
 1951
 1950 in Malaya | 1952 in Malaya
 History of Malaysia

References 

 
Years of the 20th century in Malaysia
Malaya
Malaya
Malaya